The Bennet family is a fictional family created by the English novelist Jane Austen, in her 1813 novel, Pride and Prejudice. The family consists of Mr. and Mrs. Bennet, and their five daughters: Jane, Mary, Catherine, Lydia, and Elizabeth, the novel's protagonist. 

Set in the Regency era, the family belongs to the landed gentry of Hertfordshire. The complex relationships between the Bennets influence the evolution of the plot as they navigate the difficulties faced by young women in attempting to secure a good future through marriage.

The Bennets' daughters 
Jane and Elizabeth show irreproachable conduct and are appreciated by their father. Their sister Mary is described as less physically attractive and displays intellectual and musical pretensions. The two youngest daughters, Lydia and Kitty (Catherine) are supervised very little by their parents and are portrayed as immature, fickle young girls.

The other members of the family are Mrs Bennet's brother and sister-in law (Mr and Mrs Gardiner), and her sister Mrs. Philips, and the designated heir of Mr. Bennet's estate, his distant paternal second cousin, the pompous and foolish Mr. William Collins.

Mr. Gardiner and Mrs. Philips contribute significantly to the progress and outcome of the story, but at a level and in a different register, reflecting their respective social belonging.

Collins' character serves as a link between the gentry of Hertfordshire, to which the Bennets belong, and the large property owners Lady Catherine de Bourgh and Mr. Darcy who later marries Elizabeth.

Paternal branch 

The Bennet couple do not assume their role as educators: the mother repeatedly makes a spectacle of herself. She is overly eager to find husbands for her daughters. This eagerness is displayed in her behaviour, and she fails to understand that this behaviour is likely to dissuade young men from marrying her daughters. The father, who seems to be an indifferent husband, makes no effort to change his wife's behaviour. He is more intent on 'enjoying the show' than in correcting her behaviour, and the behaviour of his younger daughters.

The narrator does not elaborate on the ancestors of Mr Bennet. This is only established  for the Collinses, father and son, who are described as Mr. Bennet's 'distant' cousins.

The presumption is that a younger Collins son (possibly an ancestor of Mr. Bennet's) once changed his name to Bennet, possibly in anticipation of receiving an inheritance (as Jane Austen's own brother did; it was a common practice in Georgian England), or vice versa. Readers of the time would have recognized the impossibility of Mr. Collins being the descendant of a female relative of Mr. Bennet's, as inheritances always descended through a strict male line (although this would not account for how the Bennets and Collinses came to be related to each other in the first place). However, as a grandson born to a daughter would be a closer relative, it is possible that the Collinses do, in fact, descend from a female - they are next in line because his daughters aren't married and there are no other male heirs to inherit, so it passes to the "son via daughter of a distant Mr Bennet ancestor", like it would for Mr Bennet's own grandson.

A holder of an estate can entail it for two generations succeeding him. Mr. Bennet's grandfather entailed the estate first directly through the male descendants of his son then failing that through the male descendants of his own daughter. Collins is a descendant of Mr. Bennet's great aunt who presumably married below her station.

Mr. Bennet

Mr. Bennet, the patriarch of the now-dwindling Bennet family (a family of Hertfordshire landed gentry), is a landed gentleman of a comfortable income. He is married to Mrs Bennet, the daughter of a Meryton attorney, the late Mr Gardiner Sr. Together they have five daughters; Jane, Elizabeth ("Lizzy"/"Eliza"), Mary, Catherine ("Kitty"), and Lydia Bennet. None of the daughters is married at the beginning of the novel, much to Mrs Bennet's dismay.

Mr Bennet's family estate, Longbourn House, comprises a residence and land located within the environs of the fictional township of Meryton, in Hertfordshire, just north of London. From his family estate, Mr Bennet derives an annual income of £2,000. This was a very respectable income for a  gentleman of the time (but certainly not on the same scale to Mr Darcy's annual income of £10,000). Longbourn House has an entailment upon it, meant to keep the estate intact and in the sole possession of the family, down the male line, rather than being divided also amongst younger sons and any daughters; it is to be passed down amongst first male heirs only. For years, Mr Bennet had the hope and intention of fathering a son who was to inherit the entire estate; which would see to the entail for another generation and potentially provide for his widow and any other children he might have. Additionally, Mr Bennet did not get along with his then-closest living male relative and male heir, his distant cousin, Mr Collins (Sr.), who is described as an "illiterate miser" (this possibly results from some disagreement over the entail), and did not want the estate to be given to him. Sadly, after 23 or 24 years of marriage, Mr. Bennet remains the last male scion of the Bennet family, meaning that his death will be the end of the Bennet name.

However, Mr Collins is not assured of inheriting Longbourn, as he could be displaced by a son born either to Mrs Bennet or to a subsequent wife of Mr Bennet were Mrs Bennet to die and he to remarry. He cannot however be displaced in any way, shape, or form by a son born to any of Mr Bennet's daughters, as the estate is entailed 'in the male line' i.e. to a son's son, son's son's son, etc. of whoever set the entail in place.

Emily Auerbach criticises Mr Bennet for ignoring the fate of his daughters and suggests that he possesses "too little sense of duty or responsibility".  It is also possible that when he speaks of '[living] for making sport for [one's] neighbours, and laughing at them in our turn', he is also saying the same of himself and his folly of having married Mrs Bennet in the first place. It is likely that this mistake he made back as a bachelor is why he is the way he is now (see below).

"So odd a mixture"
Mr. Bennet is described by the narrator in his first appearance in the book as "so odd a mixture of quick parts, sarcastic humour, reserve, and caprice, that the experience of three and twenty years had been insufficient to make his wife understand his character", and it is this same ironic, cynical, dry, wry sense of wit and humour that irritates his wife (both because she cannot understand it, and because he does not comply with her every wish and whim).

The authorial Narrator points out Mr Bennet's many acts of negligence regarding his duties as husband and father. If he draws the sympathy of the reader by his skill at irony, he has nevertheless a certain number of faults: indifferent and irresponsible, self-centred, stubborn, indolent, and a dislike of company. According to author Phyllis Ferguson Bottomer, Mr. Bennet may suffer from a form of autism. Mr Bennet admits he married a silly girl, but he has, for his part, completely given up his social role as pater familias and does not care about the needs of his family. His disengagement is symbolized by his withdrawing into his library and hiding behind his cynical mockery.

Although Mr Bennet is an intelligent man, his indolence, lethargy, and indifference results in him opting to spend his free time ridiculing the weaknesses of others (ironically) rather than addressing his own problems. His irresponsibility has placed his family in the potentially devastating position of being homeless and destitute when he dies. He does recognize this fact, but has still done nothing to remedy the situation by for instance saving money from the estate's income to provide a non-entailed capital sum for his widow and daughters.  Mr Bennet seems to spend most all of his time (if not all of it) in his personal sanctuary, Longbourn's library/book room/study; a physical retreat from the world (signifying his emotional retreat from his family).

He regards the world with an ironic detachment.  When he is involved in a social event, such as the ball at Netherfield, he is a silent and amused witness of the blunders of his family. Even the discovery of Darcy's role in Lydia's marriage only draws from him a selfish exclamation of relief: "So much the better. It will save me a world of trouble and economy".  Though he does love his daughters (Elizabeth in particular), he often fails as a parent, preferring instead to withdraw from the never-ending marriage concerns of the women around him rather than offer help (not knowing how to handle them). In fact, he often enjoys laughing at the sillier members of his family.

Relationship with wife
Mr. Bennet has a closer relationship with Mrs Bennet's "poor nerves" than Mrs Bennet herself. It is worth noting that Mr Bennet refers to her nerves as his 'old friends, stating: "You mistake me, my dear. I have a high respect for your nerves. They are my old friends. I have heard you mention them with consideration these twenty years at least".

Later in the story (Volume 2, Chapter 19), it is revealed that Mr Bennet had only married his wife based on an initial attraction to her: "[Mr. Bennet] captivated by youth and beauty, and that appearance of good humour, which youth and beauty generally give, had married a woman, whose weak understanding, and illiberal mind, had, very early in the marriage, put an end to any real affection for her. Respect, esteem, and confidence, had vanished forever; and all of his views of domestic happiness were overthrown. But Mr. Bennet was not of a disposition to seek 'comfort' for the disappointment which his own imprudence had brought on, in any of those pleasures which too often console the unfortunate of their folly or vice. He was fond of the country and of books, and from these tastes had arisen his principal enjoyments.

His indolence is a major point of friction between Mr and Mrs Bennet, as Mrs Bennet is constantly fretting about potential suitors for her five single daughters while he pays no attention to their future welfare. It may be also safe to say that, when he speaks of '[living] for making sport for [one's] neighbours, and laughing at them in our turn', he is referring to his own culpability (certainly, he speaks from real-life experience).

Mr. Bennet openly favours Jane and Elizabeth due to their much steadier temperaments; he actively distances himself from his wife and younger daughters' activities whenever possible, even at social gatherings like assemblies, which he should be attending in order to supervise them all.

Relationship with Elizabeth
From the beginning of the novel, it is very apparent that Elizabeth is her father's favourite daughter. The two have a close "sarcastic" bond, which is apparent to everyone in the family. Mrs. Bennet, in one of her many quasi-hysterical moments, turns on her husband and exclaims: "I desire you will do no such thing. Lizzy is not a bit better than the others, and I am sure she is not half so handsome as Jane, nor half so good-humoured as Lydia. But you are always giving her the preference". To which he replies; "They have none of them much to recommend them ... they are all silly and ignorant like other girls, but Lizzy has something more of quickness than her sisters".

Despite the fact that his daughter must marry in order to be able to continue living the life of a gentlewoman, Mr. Bennet appears, for the most part, unconcerned. After Elizabeth rejects Mr. Collins' marriage proposal, Mrs. Bennet is beside herself and proclaims that she shall "never see [Elizabeth] again". Yet her father trusts Elizabeth's reasoning for not wanting to marry Mr. Collins, who would have been able to provide for her, and sarcastically declares "An unhappy alternative is before you, Elizabeth. From this day you must be a stranger to one of your parents. – Your mother will never see you again if you do not marry Mr. Collins, and I will never see you again if you do."

Though his indolent parenting style and manners are suggested to be questionable at several times in the novel, he loves his daughters (Elizabeth in particular), and ultimately, Mr. Bennet blames himself for having been insufficiently disciplining with them, which ultimately had enabled Lydia to run away with Mr. Wickham, and nor does he resent Elizabeth for her having advised him against letting Lydia go to Brighton with Colonel Forster's regiment (as the newly married Mrs. Forster's "particular friend" (Mrs. Forster being barely older than Lydia)) in the first place.

Economic shortcomings
Though Mr. Bennet appears to be an agreeable character, for he does not become involved with Mrs. Bennet's plans, he does have shortcomings which have a real possibility of affecting his wife and daughters' futures. Early in his marriage, his view was that "economy was... perfectly useless".  Instead of saving for the future interests of his family, he allows his entire annual income to be spent; this choice was supported by his wife, a spendthrift who "had no turn for economy".  While Mr. Bennet has done nothing to put sums of money away for his family in the event of his death, he has nonetheless made the effort to keep them out of debts ("and her husband's love of independence had alone prevented their exceeding their income").

This lack of economic foresight did not bother Mr. Bennet. He originally assumed his wife would eventually bear him a son, who would join him to cut off the entail and secure the financial future of the rest of his family; later on, he possibly considered the matter unimportant because he personally would never be affected. Since a son was never born, his wife was at risk of impoverishment should he predecease her, and he had no resources to attract suitors for his daughters by means of sizable dowries (which he considers bribery), nor had he educated his daughters to be useful or attractive wives.

Maternal branch 

Mrs. Bennet, born a Gardiner and married for twenty-three years (at the start of the novel), is the daughter of an attorney of Meryton in Hertfordshire. She has a brother and a sister, both married. Though equally vulgar, ignorant, thoughtless, tasteless and gossipy, the marriages of the two sisters have resulted in them revolving in different circles - one married a member of the local gentry, the other is wed to one of her late father's law clerks (doing so was probably what made him the successor to his employer's local town law firm) - while their naturally genteel brother has gone on to acquire an education and a higher social status in general trade (in a respectable line of trade) in London.

Mrs. Bennet
Mrs. Bennet (née Gardiner) is the middle-aged wife of her social superior, Mr. Bennet, and the mother of their five daughters; Jane, Elizabeth ("Lizzy"/"Eliza"), Mary, Catherine ("Kitty"), and Lydia Bennet. She is the daughter of Mr. Gardiner Sr. (now deceased), a Meryton lawyer, and sister to Mrs. Phillips and Mr. Edward Gardiner, who is some years younger than both his sisters, and is both better natured and better educated than them ("Mr. Gardiner was a sensible, gentlemanlike man, greatly superior to his sister, as well by nature as education").

Like her favourite daughter, Lydia, Mrs. Bennet is shameless, frivolous, and very 'silly' ("[Mrs. Bennet's] mind was less difficult to develop. She was a woman of mean understanding, little information, and uncertain temper. When she was discontented, she fancied herself nervous. The business of her life was to get her daughters married; its solace was visiting and 'news' ... [Mr. Bennet] captivated by youth and beauty, and that appearance of good humour, which youth and beauty generally give, had married a woman, whose weak understanding, and illiberal mind, had, very early in the marriage, put an end to any real affection for her").

She is susceptible to attacks of 'tremors and palpitations' ("[her] poor nerves"), which happen whenever she is defensive or displeased. She is also prone to flights of fancy, flights of pique, and flights of melodrama, believing herself to regularly ill-used, talking loudly of it (hinting that she may be tone deaf), as well as having the bad habits of counting her chickens before they hatch (prophesying about her daughter, Jane's great marriage match, only for Mr. Bingley to fail to return from London when he said he would, and never took into account that she had been wrong, instead implying that the deficiency was either with Jane (for failing to 'catch' him) or Bingley (for not being 'caught')); and talking out of both sides of her mouth.

She is very much a child still; emotionally stunted and immature, but in an adult's body; likewise with her most favoured daughter, Lydia, with whom she shares a rapport, indulging all of her 'silly', forward and selfish behaviour, and has for years filled Lydia's head with tales of lace, bonnets, high fashions, men in regimentals ("[Lydia] is very young; she has never been taught to think on serious subjects; and for the last half-year, nay, for a twelvemonth, she has been given up to nothing but amusement and vanity. She has been allowed to dispose of her time in the most idle and frivolous manner, and to adopt any opinions that came in her way. Since the ----shire were first quartered in Meryton, nothing but love, flirtation, and officers have been in her head. She has been doing every thing in her power, by thinking and talking on the subject, to give greater – what shall I call it? – susceptibility to her feelings, which are naturally lively enough").  Following her marriage, her ascension to the ranks of the gentry has given her an inflated sense of entitlement.  Mrs. Bennet is also just like her youngest daughter, in that, as a compulsive gossip and blabbermouth, she is completely incapable of keeping secrets and respecting confidences, even at the expense of her family when she made no effort to keep the news of Lydia's disgrace quiet, allowing it to get out around Meryton.

In the first chapter the narrator warns that Mrs. Bennet is "a woman of mean understanding, little information and uncertain temper". Seduced by her "youth and beauty, and that appearance of good-humour which youth and beauty generally give", Mr. Bennet married her quickly, discovering too late that she was stupid, narrow-minded and shallow. Although her first name is never mentioned, it is likely to be 'Jane', since it was customary to give the given name of the mother to the eldest daughter.  Her personal fortune inherited from her father amounted to £4,000 (invested at 4% for a sum of £160-per-annum, or in the 5% for a sum of £200-per-annum, which she squanders)), which is a lot of money for someone of her condition ("and their mother's fortune, though ample for her situation in life, could but ill supply the deficiency of his.  Her father had been an attorney in Meryton, and had left her four thousand pounds").

From Mr Collins' proposal to Elizabeth  - " ["to fortune I am perfectly indifferent, and shall made no demands of that nature on your father, since I am well aware that it could not be complied with; and that one thousand pounds in the 4 per cent. which will not be yours till after your mother's decease, is all that you may ever be entitled to"], it appears probable that her settlement had increased to £5,000 over the years, having had an additional £1,000 settled-upon her by her husband as a Jointure (to allow for all five of her daughters to have the same fortune), but remains invested at 4%.

Marrying above her station, raising her social class, it has given her illusory superiority of her own worth.  She repeatedly makes a spectacle of herself, incapable of realizing that her behaviour is more likely to be off-putting to any rich, eligible young man who would take notice of her daughters.  Her vulgar public manners, her crude, artless and transparent efforts at social climbing and matchmaking, and her all-around 'silliness' are a source of constant embarrassment to both Jane and Elizabeth.  But, if one good thing has come from her lacking of good social graces, it is that they have helped to keep her eldest two daughters humble, (as opposed to her younger three, who (like their mother) lack any self-awareness as to their own character flaws).  Her main ambition in life is to marry her daughters off to wealthy men, about whom she can boast and brag to her friends and neighbours: Mrs. Phillips (her sister), Lady Lucas (wife of Sir William Lucas, of Lucas Lodge), Mrs. Long, and Mrs. Goulding (of Haye Park), and especially to Lady Lucas, of whom she seems to be jealous.  Whether or not any such matches will give her daughters happiness is of little concern to her.

Her pastimes are shopping, 'socializing', and gossiping and boasting.  Her favourite daughter is her youngest, Lydia, who takes very much after her younger self. Next she values her eldest, Jane, though only for Jane's great physical beauty, and she never considers Jane's feelings, virtue, or reputation. Her least favourite daughter is Elizabeth (closely followed by Mary) who she does not understand (or like) at all; when Mr. Collins was directing his 'enraptured heart' at Elizabeth, Mrs. Bennet thought them both together a perfect match purely because she does not like either of them ("Mrs. Bennet was perfectly satisfied; and quitted the house under the delightful persuasion that, allowing for the necessary preparations of settlements, new carriages, and wedding clothes, she should undoubtedly see [Jane] settled at Netherfield in the course of three or four months. Of having [Elizabeth] married to Mr. Collins, she thought with equal certainty, and with considerable, though not equal, pleasure. Elizabeth was the least dear to her of all her children; and though the man and the match were quite 'good enough' for her, the worth of each was eclipsed by Mr. Bingley and Netherfield").

An ignorant and narrow-minded petite bourgeoise

Between the Gardiner siblings, Mrs. Bennet is the one that had the best wedding, since she married a member of the local gentry, owner of a domain with an income of  £2000 annually. But this domain is under the regime of substitution for a male heir (fee tail male), a rule of succession which she has never understood why her husband could do nothing to change (despite it having been explained to her numerous times (she assumes that he simply won't change it on purpose to stress her "poor nerves")), since it clouded his future and that of his daughters, given that she and her husband were unable to have a boy.  They had hoped for years, even after the birth of Lydia, the son who would have allowed to put an end to the entail, but they only had girls, five daughters over the course of seven years.

And now that she is middle-aged, having lost nigh-all hope of giving birth to a son, Mrs Bennet is obsessed with the idea of losing her material security, and to be deprived of the social situation to which she is long accustomed to (and, to her mind, entirely deserving of); the possibility of becoming a widow and being expelled from the domain by the heir-presumptive Mr Collins terrifies her.

On the other hand, however, Mrs. Bennet is not so merciful, herself; when after Mr. Collins' and Miss Charlotte Lucas' engagement is announced, Mrs. Bennet becomes very paranoid about their plans, any time she sees them talking together up until their wedding, she is convinced that they were both just counting down the hours until the time that they can assume possession of Longbourn and 'throw her out to live in the hedgerows' ("Mrs. Bennet was really in a most pitiable state. The very mention of anything concerning the match threw her into an agony of ill humour, and wherever she went she was sure of hearing it talked of. The sight of Miss Lucas was odious to her. As her successor in that house, she regarded her with jealous abhorrence. Whenever Charlotte came to see them she concluded her to be anticipating the hour of possession; and whenever she spoke in a low voice to Mr. Collins, was convinced that they were talking of the Longbourn estate, and resolving to turn herself and her daughters out of the house as soon as Mr. Bennet were dead"), all before Mr. Bennet is 'cold in his grave' (despite the fact that Mr. Bennet is healthy); completely ignoring the fact that this is exactly what she herself (and Lady Lucas) would be doing if she was in Charlotte Lucas' situation.  She quickly start to view Charlotte as a conniving intruder as Lady Lucas takes every chance to rub in her triumph ("it is very hard to think that Charlotte Lucas should ever be mistress of this house, that I should be forced to make way for her, and live to see her take my place in it!").  And even when she does start to make a semblance of peace with the 'inevitable', she would mutter, under her breath, "repeatedly to say in an ill-natured tone that she 'wished they might be happy'," when really, she wishes them both ill-will.

Thereby her fixed idea, "the business of her life" ever since Jane, the eldest, has reached 16 years old, is the urgent need to find a husband financially secure for her daughters to their safeguard and her own. Thus, she shows immediate interest in the arrival of an eligible bachelor in the region.  So she sends Jane to Netherfield in the rain to make sure they retain her there, she encourages Mr Collins to ask for the hand of Elizabeth, and she rejoices loudly for the marriage of Lydia, shamelessly triumphant ("No sentiment of shame gave a damp to her triumph" specifies the narrator), indifferent to the dishonourable reasons which made it necessary (and the fact that a man had to be bribed to marry her favourite daughter), since it corresponds to the realization of "her dearest wishes" to have her daughter 'well married', but fails to realise that Wickham will only ever prove to be a drain upon the family's resources, rather than a boon (and thus not "well married").

By marrying, she has changed her own social status, but she continues to behave like an ignorant, one-dimensional, petite bourgeoise from Meryton. She is one of the simple characters; these characters, like Mr. Collins or Lady Catherine, and her own daughter Lydia, are frozen and unable to evolve: in twenty-three years of marriage she has not changed. As soon as she is upset, incapable of analysis, reflection or questioning, she gets defensive and has an anxiety attack ("She fancied herself nervous").

Narrow-minded and ignorant, she has only the vaguest idea of how to behave in good society. Her lack of intelligence and narrowness of mind ("weak understanding and illiberal mind") quickly resulted in the neglect by her husband, who for a long time has felt nothing more for her than a mocking indifference tinged with contempt; if he does still have feelings for her, they are of a disappointed variety of love, although it is a fact that he remained faithful to her ("[Mr. Bennet] captivated by youth and beauty, and that appearance of good humour, which youth and beauty generally give, had married a woman whose weak understanding and illiberal mind, had very early in the marriage put an end to any real affection for her. Respect, esteem, and confidence, had vanished forever; and all of his views of domestic happiness were overthrown. But Mr. Bennet was not of a disposition to seek comfort for the disappointment which his own imprudence had brought on, in any of those pleasures which too often console the unfortunate of their folly or vice.  He was fond of the country and of books; and from these tastes had arisen his principal enjoyments").

Her notion of stylish behavior is summarized in what she told Sir William: "He has always something to say to everybody. – That is my idea of good breeding". She behaves with embarrassing vulgarity and lack of tact, especially at Netherfield, where her pretentiousness, foolishness and "total lack of correction" are particularly evident.  She is completely devoid of empathy, save for herself and Lydia, and, having the mentality of a peahen, she is only sensitive to the outward appearances (Jane's superior physical beauty, handsome men in militia uniforms, Mrs. Hurst's expensive laces).  For her, it is not the manners or behavior that indicate belonging to a high rank, it is ostentatious and flaunting her wealth, and the validity of a marriage is measured by the amount "of calico, muslin and cambric" to buy for the bride's trousseau.  Thus, Mr. Bennet's refusal to get new clothes for her beloved Lydia in her wedding day shocked her more than the fifteen days lived unmarried with Wickham ("She was more alive to the disgrace which the want of new clothes must reflect on her daughter's nuptials, than to any sense of shame at her eloping and living with Wickham a fortnight before they took place").

These tendencies are seen more even more ludicrous upon Lydia's marriage ("Mr. Bennet and his daughters saw all the advantages of Wickham's removal from the ----shire as clearly as Mr. Gardiner could do.  But Mrs. Bennet was not so well pleased with it.  Lydia's being settled in the North, just when [Mrs. Bennet] had expected most pleasure and pride in [Lydia's] company – for [Mrs. Bennet] had by no means given up her plan of their residing in Hertfordshire – was a severe disappointment; and besides, it was such a pity that Lydia should be taken from a regiment where she was acquainted with everybody, and had so many favourites.  ...  "She is so fond of Mrs. Forster", said [Mrs. Bennet], "it will be quite shocking to send her away! And there are several of the young men, too, that she likes very much"), completely glossing over Lydia's ruination and rescue, as if events had actually been different then they actually had.

An egocentric hypochondriac

Jane Austen has particularly charged the character of Mrs Bennett in negative terms. As Virginia Woolf wrote, "no excuse is found for [her fools] and no mercy shown them [...] Sometimes it seems as if her creatures were born merely to give [her] the supreme delight of slicing their heads off". In the tradition of the comedy of manners and didactic novel, she uses a caricatural and parodic character to mock some of her contemporaries.

Mrs. Bennet is distinguished primarily by her propensity to logorrhea, a defect that Thomas Gisborne considers specifically feminine. She does not listen to any advice, especially if it comes from Elizabeth (whom she does not like), makes redundant and repetitive speeches, chatters annoyingly, makes speeches full of absurdities and inconsistencies, which she accompanies, when she is thwarted, with complaints and continual cantankerous remarks that her interlocutors are careful not to interrupt, knowing that it would only serve to prolong them. Even the ever-patient Jane finds her mother's complaints hard to bear, when Mrs. Bennet manifests "a longer irritation than usual" about the absence of Mr. Bingley, confessing to Elizabeth how much the lack of self-control of her mother revives her suffering ("Oh that my dear mother had more command over herself! she can have no idea of the pain she gives me by her continual reflections on him").

Another emphasized and systematically ridiculed aspect is her "nervous disease" or rather her tendency to use her alleged weakness nervous to get noticed and attract compassion to herself (it is noteworthy to observe that Wickham does something like this, too, but is more subtle about it), or else demanding that they dance attendance on her leave, but ultimately failing to make herself loved. There are characters particularly concerned about their health in all the novels of Jane Austen; those hypochondriacs that she calls "poor honey" in her letters. These egocentric characters who use their real or imagined ailments to reduce all to them, seem to be inspired by Mrs Bennet, whose complaints about her health had the ability to irritate Jane, who speaks with certain ironic annoyance about it in her letters to her sister. The narrator has fun describing her displaced joy, her good humor overwhelming to those around her ("spirits oppressively high"), since she learns that Lydia's wedding is a fact, and her haste to announce the "good news" to all Meryton, shamelessly triumphant ("No sentiment of shame gave a damp to her triumph" specifies the narrator), again indifferent to the dishonourable reasons which made it necessary (and the fact that a man had to be bribed to marry her favourite daughter), since it corresponds to the realization of "her dearest wishes" to have her daughter 'well married', and so fails to realise that Wickham will only ever prove to be a drain upon the family's resources, rather than a boon (and thus not 'well married').

Some critics, however, point out that it would be unfair to see only her faults. Her obsession is justified by the family's situation: the cynicism of Mr Bennet will not prevent Mr Collins from inheriting Longbourn. She, at least, unlike her husband, thinks about the future of her daughters in seeking to place them socially, (although it is just as likely that she anticipates being able to rely on them financially in the event of being left a widow). In an environment where there are numerous young ladies to be married (all neighbors: the Longs, the Lucases, have daughters or nieces to marry) and few interesting parties, she is much more attentive to the competition than her husband. She does not neglect her daughters, while he merely treats them mostly as "stupid and ignorant as all the girls", and is shut selfishly in his library.

Disappointed by her "mediocre intelligence", he enjoys disconcerting her with his "sarcastic humor", but he increases the anxiety of her "unequal character" by refusing to accept legitimate requests: why tell her that he will not visit Bingley on his arrival in the country, when, in fact, he has the firm intention of doing so? She is well aware that he takes pleasure in contradicting her (feels "no compassion for [her] poor nerves"), never realizing that she is the one who sets herself up for it every time.  Not smart enough to understand his mindset and unsatisfied herself, she "fancied herself nervous", the narrator says. She really suffers from the mocking indifference from her husband and feels misunderstood; her appreciation for visits and gossip is a consolation, a solace for an unhappily married woman.

But, because Mrs. Bennet is unintelligent, the narrator is merciless and seems to take the same perverse pleasure as Mr. Bennet in mocking her and noting all her ridiculous interventions.  The narrator does not forgive her stupidity, nor her awkward interferences, and finds her absurd remarks and pretensions inherently selfish.  When Jane asks her to feel gratitude to her brother, who had paid a lot of money towards Lydia's wedding, she replied that 'had he not had children, that she and her daughters will inherit all his property', and he has never been 'really generous so far' ("If he had not had a family of his own, I and my children must have had all his money, you know; and it is the first time we have ever had anything from him, except a few presents").  Lydia's marriage does not satisfy her as much as she wanted, because her daughter did not stay long enough with her so that she could continue to parade with her. ("Lydia does not leave me because she is married, but only because her husband's regiment happens to be so far off. If that had been nearer, she would not have gone so soon"), and if she was able to happily "for all her maternal feelings [get] rid of her most deserving daughters"; the marriage of Jane will only satisfy her "delighted pride" during the year that the Bingleys spent at Netherfield.

Mrs. Bennet is not treated any better by Jane Austen than Lady Catherine, who shows the same lack of taste, and as many selfish pretensions and such ridiculous interferences; her rudeness of rich and aristocrat pride embarrasses her nephew, just as the vulgarity of her mother irritates Elizabeth.  For Jane Austen, nothing can excuse the stupidity that exists at all levels of society.

Guilty negligences

Mrs Bennet has not really raised the girls that she would like so much to see married, as good housekeepers. She never gave them any notion of home economics, which was the traditional role of a mother in a middle-class family.

It was Thomas Gisborne who theorized in An Enquiry Into the Duties of Men, published in 1794, and in An Enquiry into the Duties of the Female Sex, published in 1797, the idea of areas reserved for men and women. According to him, women are by nature destined to the domestic sphere, defined as the particular area where "their excellence deploys". Therefore, their role is to keep the house and direct the domestic sphere. Mrs. Bennet openly mocks Charlotte Lucas when she is forced to go into the kitchen in order to supervise the tarts making, proudly saying that her "daughters are brought up differently"; also, she reacts with force when Mr Collins, on the day of his arrival, assumed that his cousins took part in the preparation of dinner. Even if it was unnecessary for her daughters to do kitchen work, they should have learnt how to supervise the servants who did such work.

Mrs. Bennet also adds that they live quite well, since Mr. Bennet spends annually his entire comfortable income: Mrs Bennet "had no turn for economy"; and for Lydia-only the expenses amounted to approximately £90-per year (almost double her allowance, because of her income (the £40 Interest from her 1/5 share of her mother's dowry), plus all of the additional indulgences of her mother providing her with more ("and the continual presents in money which passed to her through her mother's hands, Lydia's expenses had been very little within [£100 per annum]"), and going to her sisters to borrow money (which she then never pays back)); with the £100-per annum financial arrangements (for the rest of Mr. Bennet's life) made for her marriage, Mr. Bennet is "scarcely £10 pounds more out of pocket" than he was before Lydia's marriage.

Children

Jane Bennet

Jane Bingley (née Bennet) is the eldest Bennet sister (being 22-years-old at the beginning of the novel and 23-years-old by the middle-to-end of the novel, with her birthday being estimated in the early springtime). Like her immediately younger sister, Elizabeth, Jane is favoured by her father, due to her steady, genteel disposition.  Like each of her sisters, Jane had an allowance/pin money of £40 per annum (invested at 4 per cent on £1,000 from her mother's fortune/dowry by settlement upon her death) before her marriage to Charles Bingley.  At twenty-two years old when the novel begins (twenty-three at the end), she is considered the most beautiful young lady in the neighbourhood.

Jane's character is contrasted with Elizabeth's as sweeter, shyer, and equally sensible, but not as clever (but she is aware of this fact); an introvert, her most notable trait is a desire to see only the good in others. As Anna Quindlen wrote, Jane is "sugar to Elizabeth's lemonade". Jane (along with her sister, Elizabeth) seems to have taken after her father's side of the family, having been portrayed as a sweet, steady, gentle, genteel girl (unlike her mother).  Her inner beauty is equally-matched by her outer beauty.  She is favoured by her mother (next after her youngest sister, Lydia) solely because of her external beauty.  If Jane has taken anything after her mother, it is a certain inflexibility of thought; but while her mother's inflexibility of thought leans in a wholly selfish direction, Jane's is in a selfless one; Jane is very unwilling to think ill of others (unless sufficient evidence presents itself), whereas her mother will think ill of anyone on little-to-no evidence at-all.

Jane falls in love with the affable and amiable Mr. Bingley ("He is just what a young man ought to be", said [Jane], "sensible, good humoured, lively; and I never saw such happy manners! – so much ease, with such perfect good breeding"), a rich young man who has recently leased Netherfield Park, a neighbouring estate in Hertfordshire, and a close friend of Mr. Darcy. Their love is initially thwarted by Mr. Darcy and Caroline Bingley, who are each concerned by Jane's low connections and have other plans for Bingley, involving Miss Darcy, Mr Darcy's sister. Mr. Darcy, aided by Elizabeth, eventually sees the error in his ways and is instrumental in bringing Jane and Bingley back together.  Ironically, both Jane and Mr. Darcy (and Miss. Darcy) have something in-common; they're both introverted and shy; but where Mr. Darcy has the luxury of indulging his shyness (being able to get away without having to interact with anyone he doesn't want to at social gatherings), Jane had long had to learn to manage her shyness, having no choice but to be present in social events (her mother having brought her 'out' into society at 16-years).

As described in volume 3, chapter 19 (the epilogue) after their marriage, the happy couple only manage to live at Netherfield for a year before life in Meryton (being imposed upon by Mrs. Bennet and Mrs. Phillips and their ill-bred, silly, thoughtless behavior) proved to be too much for their good tempers, leading them to give up the lease on the estate and establish themselves elsewhere ("Mr. Bingley and Jane remained at Netherfield only a twelve-month.  So near a vicinity to her mother and Meryton relations was not desirable even to his easy temper, or her affectionate heart.  The darling wish of his sisters was then gratified; he bought an estate in a neighbouring county to Derbyshire, and Jane and Elizabeth, in addition to every source of happiness, were within thirty-miles of each other.")

Elizabeth Bennet

Elizabeth Darcy (née Bennet) The reader sees the unfolding plot and the other characters mostly from her viewpoint. The second of the Bennet daughters (being 20-years-old at the beginning of the novel and 21-years-old by the middle-to-end of the novel, with her birthday being estimated around Easter), and is intelligent, lively, playful, attractive, and witty, but with a tendency to judge others upon her first impressions (the "prejudice" of the title;) and perhaps to be a little selective of the evidence on which she bases her judgments. Like each of her sisters, Elizabeth had an allowance/pin money of £40 per annum (invested at 4 per cent on £1,000 from her mother's fortune/dowry by settlement upon her death).  As the plot begins, her closest relationships are with her father (as his favourite daughter), her sister Jane, her Aunt Gardiner, and her best friend Charlotte Lucas. She is also the least favourite of her mother, Mrs. Bennet because of her resistance to her mother's plans (a rank in which she is tied closely with her plain sister, Mary, whom Mrs. Bennet also looks down upon).  As the story progresses, so does her relationship with Mr. Fitzwilliam Darcy, Esquire. The course of Elizabeth and Darcy's relationship is ultimately decided when Darcy overcomes his pride, and Elizabeth overcomes her prejudice, leading them each to acknowledge their love for the other.

Mary Bennet
Mary Bennet is the middle (being around 18/19-years-old at the beginning of the novel and 19/20-years-old by the middle-to-end of the novel), and only plain and solemn Bennet sister.  Like both her two younger sisters, Kitty and Lydia, she is seen as being 'silly' by Mr. Bennet, and as not even pretty like her sisters (and for not being 'good-humoured' like Lydia) by Mrs. Bennet. Mary is not very intelligent, but thinks of herself as being wise.  Socially inept, Mary is more in the habit of talking at someone, moralizing, rather than to them; rather than join in some of the family activities, Mary mostly reads, plays music and sings, although she is often impatient to display her 'accomplishments' and is rather vain and pedantic about them; vanity is disguised as discipline ("Mary had neither genius nor taste; and though vanity had given her application, it had given her likewise a pedantic air and conceited manner, which would have injured a higher degree of excellence than she had reached").  She is convinced that merely having read/re-read a number of books makes her an authority on those subjects.  Mary is very unaware of all of this, fancying herself to be intelligent, wise and very accomplished; and this is likely to be the reason why her father considers her to be 'silly' like her mother and younger sisters, though more prim and sensible than them.

Mary also tries to be pious, high-minded and morally superior and beyond approach, only instead to come across as being both very sanctimonious, self-righteous, and haughty, and very, very dull; she seems to have assumed that, by always assuming the moral high ground (which she seems to brag about) ('[following] them in pride and conceit', not unlike Mr. Darcy): "Far be it from me, my dear sister, to depreciate such pleasures. They would doubtless be congenial with the generality of female minds. But I confess they would have no charms for me – I should infinitely prefer a book"), she will be setting herself above her sisters, when she is always being compared to them (by her mother – something which only seems to stop after they had all been married off, as mentioned in the epilogue).  While Mary is not what one would call introspective, she is not what one would call extrospective, either; she is socially awkward, lacking any real social graces or observations about herself or others.

Mary is like a caricature of an overly bookish young woman, who spends all of her time reading and memorizing texts, but does not really get the point of what she is reading, saying in conversation (i.e. when Elizabeth declares her intention of going to Netherfield by foot, Mary inserts herself into the conversation; "I admire the activity of your benevolence", observed Mary, "but every impulse of feeling should be guided by reason; and, in my opinion, exertion should always be in proportion to what is required"; unwittingly, Mary declares that Jane is not worth the effort of walking the three miles between Longbourn and Netherfield).  While she has inherited her father's fondness for books, she has also inherited her mother's lack of self-awareness and discernment; only able to pick up on the most superficial meanings of what she reads, as well as a tendency to utter repetitions of phrases from the books in place of original conversation. Didactic, Mary constantly recites awkward interpretations of what are supposed to be profound observations about human nature and life in general from her books, declaring them to be "[her] observations", unable to discern where different books by different authors contradict one another, and is totally unable to think critically about her books, giving them more benefit than people.  Whilst one cannot fault her on her fastidiousness and application, Mary's lack of insight and talent makes her come across as ignorant, pedantic, ultracrepidarian, and very naïve when lecturing others; she is more likely to merely reflect over scripture at face value than to act upon them.

When Mr. Collins is refused by Elizabeth, Mrs. Bennet hopes Mary may be prevailed upon to accept him, and the impression the reader is given is that Mary also harboured some hopes in this direction ("Mrs. Bennet wished to understand by it that [Mr. Collins] thought of paying his address to one of her younger girls, and Mary might have been prevailed on to accept him.  [Mary] rated his abilities much higher than any of the others; there was a solidity in his reflections which often struck her, and though by no means so clever as herself she thought that if encouraged to read and improve himself by such an example as hers, he might become a very agreeable companion"), but neither of them know that he is already engaged to Charlotte Lucas by this time until informed so by Charlotte's father, Sir William Lucas. This also shows that Mary can be and is easily influenced simply by someone with the position in society, such as that of a clergyman; her biased respect blinding her as to how ridiculous Mr. Collins actually is.

Mary does work hard for her knowledge and accomplishments (reading publications such as "Pastor Fordyce's Sermons to Young Women"), ever-diligently applying herself to them; but, despite the fact that she is studious, was once described as the most accomplished girl in the neighbourhood; and none can question her fastidiousness, drive and work ethic, Mary yet lives in ignorance of the full meaning of almost everything she studies, and she sadly has neither genius nor taste (and is potentially tone deaf, as she cannot discern that her singing is bad).  Mary is still a sympathetic character: her parents are biased and ineffective, her two older and two younger sisters have neatly paired off together, which leaves her alone as the odd one out, and she is probably the Bennet daughter who is most ignored, which might be why she puts so much effort in trying to impress people, clinging to what she feels makes her stand out from her sisters (possibly a mentality she has inherited from her mother).  Mary also has little understanding and sympathy for her sisters - Lydia most of all.

Like each of her sisters, Mary had an allowance/pin money of £40 per annum (invested at 4 per cent on £1,000 from her mother's fortune/dowry by settlement upon her death) before her marriage (see below).  Mary does not appear often in the main action of the novel.  However, it is said in volume 3, chapter 19 (the epilogue) that, now with Jane, Elizabeth, and Lydia now married and moved out of Longbourn, and Kitty living primarily with Jane and Elizabeth, Mary received more 'attention' from her mother, and was made to mix more with people during company ("Mary was the only daughter who remained at home; and she was necessarily drawn from the pursuit of accomplishments by Mrs. Bennet's being quite unable to sit alone.  Mary was obliged to mix more with the world, but she could still moralize over every morning visit; and as she was no-longer mortified by comparisons between her sisters' beauty and her own, it was suspected by her father that she submitted to the change with out much reluctance").

According to James Edward Austen-Leigh's A Memoir of Jane Austen, Mary ended up marrying one of her Uncle Philips' law clerks (no name for him is mentioned, so her married name remains unknown), and moved into Meryton with him, ("[Mary] obtained nothing higher in marriage than one of her uncle Philips' clerks" and "was content to be considered a 'star' in the society of Meryton").

Catherine "Kitty" Bennet
Catherine "Kitty" Bennet is Mr. and Mrs. Bennet's fourth daughter (being 17-years-old at the beginning of the novel and 18-years-old by the middle-to-end of the novel); she is one of the novel's more lightweight characters. Her role in the Bennet family is little more than as the pliable, easily downtrodden, easily hurt, and easily teased flirt, whose substance is largely borrowed from Lydia.  Kitty is described as "weak-spirited", "irritable", and (along with Lydia) "ignorant, idle and vain", she is also fainéant, easily intimidated, easily moved aside, dismissed and ignored (something she actually has in common with her sister, Mary; but while Mary seems to have been left to survive this alone, Kitty has attached herself to Lydia), and is easily led.  While she and Lydia have a number of similar interests, Kitty is weak-minded, lacking in resolve, and simply lacks Lydia's 'spark', spunk and motivation, always seeming to be 'luckless' and one step behind her.

Despite the fact that she is older than Lydia by two years, Kitty is almost completely under her younger sister's influence (being weak-willed), living off of whatever crumbs of second hand attention and affection from their mother that rubs off of Lydia (what little importance she temporarily gained as the one who Lydia wrote most to when she went to Brighton with Mrs. Forster, ("[Kitty] owned, with very natural triumph, on knowing more than the rest of [her family]"), taking advantage of every possible occasion of opportunity to feel as important as possible), and not recognizing the consequences of keeping Lydia's plot to elope a secret from her family, generally ("Our importance, our respectability in the world, must be affected by the wild volatility, the assurance and disdain of all restraint which mark Lydia's character. ...  Oh! my dear father, can you suppose it possible that they will not be censured and despised wherever they are known, and that their sisters will not be often involved in the disgrace?") and to her personally ("Poor Kitty has anger for having concealed their attachment").  Little more than a 'sidekick', and virtually Lydia's shadow, Kitty's individuality is practically non-existent throughout most of the story; lacking much in the way of personal depth, she does not have an original idea in her head, following Lydia's lead in every matter, agreeing with Lydia, and mostly letting Lydia do her thinking for her.  Kitty's own lack of confidence restrains her from reacting with equal alacrity.

Although she is portrayed as having no different thought from Lydia, Lydia does take her for granted (Lydia drops her for Mrs. Forster (who is somewhere around the same age as Kitty, is also easily influenced by Lydia, and comes with 'perks'), so Kitty does hold some resentment towards her, (i.e. when Lydia is invited to Brighton by the newly married Mrs. Forster, Kitty is portrayed as being envious of Lydia, declaring that, as the older sister by two years, she had just as much right to be invited as Lydia), but yet does not seem to pick up on the pattern of behaviour where Lydia takes advantage of her again and again, and Kitty is left getting into trouble because of her antics (i.e. when Kitty keeps the fact that Lydia was eloping with Wickham from her family and then, after the news gets out, ends up suffering her father's displeasure).

Little more than the reflection of Lydia throughout the story, they share many of the same pursuits; Kitty greatly enjoys dancing, shopping, fashions, and joining with Lydia in engaging in flirtations with the officers of the militia regiment that has been posted at Meryton over the winter, but here also she is overshadowed by Lydia, who is more forward, assertive, and demanding of attention.  Kitty's idiosyncrasies are the result of the two most singular aspects of her life; the first is the influence Lydia holds over her; the second is the lack of acknowledgement Kitty receives from her family. Even her parents are guilty of this unintended negligence. In the first few chapters, when Mr. and Mrs. Bennet are quarreling about Mr. Bingley, Mrs. Bennet, in lieu of a better comeback, "began scolding one of her daughters" simply for coughing.

It is mentioned in Volume 2, chapter 37, that, whilst her oldest sisters, Jane and Elizabeth, have tried over the years (prior to the events of the book, Pride and Prejudice) to educate  Kitty and Lydia in order that they might stop their wild and ill-bred behaviours of, their efforts had, been seen as 'interfering' by Kitty and Lydia ("Catherine, weak-spirited, irritable, and completely under Lydia's guidance, had been always affronted by their advice"); Jane and Elizabeth's attempts had also undermined by their mother (who sees nothing wrong with the younger sisters' behaviour (especially with Lydia)), and unsupported by their father (who is amused by Kitty and Lydia's 'silliness' and simply will not trouble himself with the effort involved in educating them.

Like each of her sisters, Kitty had an allowance/pin money of £40 per annum (invested at 4 per cent on £1,000 from her mother's fortune/dowry by settlement upon her death) (see below).

It is later said, in volume 3, chapter 19 (the epilogue) that, with Lydia's negative influence removed, and often spending much time in the company of her two well-behaved older sisters, Kitty has improved ("Kitty, to her very material advantage, spent the chief of her time with her two elder sisters.  In society so superior to what she had generally known, her improvement was great.  She was not so ungovernable a temper as Lydia, and, removed from the influence of Lydia's example, she became, by proper attention and management, less irritable, less ignorant, and less insipid.  From the farther disadvantage of Lydia's society [Kitty] was carefully kept, and though Mrs. Wickham frequently invited her to come and stay with her, with the 'promise' of balls and young men, her father would never consent to her going").

According to James Edward Austen-Leigh's A Memoir of Jane Austen, Kitty later married a clergyman (no name for him is mentioned, so her married name remains unknown) who lived near Pemberley ("Catherine "Kitty" Bennet was satisfactorily married to a clergyman near Pemberley"), potentially a parish under the patronage of the Darcy family.

Lydia Bennet

Lydia Wickham (née Bennet) is the youngest Bennet sister (being 15-years-old at the beginning of the novel and 16-years-old by the middle-to-end of the novel, with her birthday being in June, after going to Brighton as Mrs. Forster's "particular friend" (but before she ran off with George Wickham)). In terms of outer appearance, Lydia is described as a strong, healthy, well-grown female, with a fine complexion and a good-humoured countenance (she also claims to be the tallest of the five sisters, though she is the youngest).

In terms of personality, Lydia is a younger version of her mother, as well as being her mother's favourite ("Lydia was...a favourite with her mother, whose affection had brought her into public at an early age"); She has a one-track mind ("silly & ignorant", "vain, ignorant, idle, and absolutely uncontrolled!", and "untamed, unabashed, wild, noisy, and fearless"), to the point of being somewhat delusional in her self-love and her estimation of her own self-importance-and-consequence; all of which her mother (who has always spoiled her, and has actively encouraged her behaviour) merely considers as 'cheerfulness', 'jolliness', and 'flirtatiousness', as it matches all of her own humours (and therefore cannot understand why Mr. Bennet favours Elizabeth over Lydia).

If Lydia has taken anything after her father, it would be his propensity/bad habit for poking fun at people; but, in Lydia's case, it is a habit of hers to mock, laugh, or else gloat at the losses, suffering, or inconvenience that befall others (especially at her own doing), declaring how "[she] will laugh [at them]".  She lives in the moment, thinking only of herself and things that relate to her own enjoyments (clothes, parties, flirting with handsome men in regimental uniforms, all paying her attention, being the envy of others), utterly wrapped up in herself, and sparing a thought for neither the past or the future, for consequences to herself or for the wellbeing of others ("But [Darcy] found Lydia absolutely resolved on remaining where she was. She cared for none of her friends; she wanted no help of [Darcy's]; she would not hear of leaving Wickham. She was sure they should be married some time or other, and it did not much signify when. Since such were her feelings, it only remained, [Darcy] thought, to secure and expedite a marriage").  She also proves to be so wrapped up in her 'adventure' that the slatternly state of the room she and Wickham were staying while in London doesn't even seem to register with her.  Lydia is also just like her mother, in that, as a compulsive gossip, she is completely incapable of keeping secrets and respecting confidences.

She dominates her older sister Kitty, whom she treats as a sidekick, because she has always been able to get away with it, and has resisted all attempts by her elder sisters Jane and Elizabeth to rein in and correct her behaviour, and is supported in the family by her mother, with whom she shares a rapport, who indulges all of her 'silly', forward and selfish behaviour, and has for years filled Lydia's head with tales of lace, bonnets, high fashions, men in regimentals ("[Lydia] is very young; she has never been taught to think on serious subjects; and for the last half-year, nay, for a twelvemonth, she has been given up to nothing but amusement and vanity. She has been allowed to dispose of her time in the most idle and frivolous manner, and to adopt any opinions that came in her way. Since the ----shire were first quartered in Meryton, nothing but love, flirtation, and officers have been in her head. She has been doing every thing in her power, by thinking and talking on the subject, to give greater – what shall I call it? – susceptibility to her feelings, which are naturally lively enough").  Likewise, Lydia's behaviour was only allowed to descend further due to her father's indolence, not taking seriously how Lydia's behaviour might negatively affect the Bennets.

Lydia is careless with her money, always spending more than her pin money allows, receiving more money from her mother ("and the continual presents in money which passed to her through her mother's hands, Lydia's expences had been very little within [£100 per annum]"), and going to her sisters to borrow money (which she then never pays back).  Like each of her sisters, Lydia had an allowance/pin money of £40 per annum (invested at 4 per cent on £1,000 from her mother's fortune/dowry by settlement upon her death) before her marriage to Wickham, after which she started receiving £100 per annum (for the rest of her father's life).  Her main priorities in life are shopping and 'socializing', especially flirting with the officers of the militia, trying to garner as much attention to herself as she can.  This behaviour only leads to her running off to London with George Wickham, although he has no intention of marrying her ("[Lydia] cared for none of her friends; she wanted no help of [Darcy's]; she would not hear of leaving Wickham; she was sure they should be married some time or other, and it did not much signify when.  Since such were her feelings, it only remained, [Darcy] thought, to secure and expedite a marriage, which, in [Darcy's very first conversation with Wickham, [Darcy] easily learnt had never been [Wickham's] design.  [Wickham] confessed himself obliged to leave the regiment on account of some debts of honour which were very pressing; and scrupled not to lay all the ill consequences of Lydia's flight on her own folly alone.") Having been pampered all of her life by her mother (and left unrestrained by her father) she has never exhibited any foresight, and so cannot think beyond her own needs and desires; Lydia also shows no regard for the moral code of her society, and no remorse for the shame and disgrace she causes her family, merely thinking of it as a "good joke", and how envious her sisters and friends would be of her that she was the first of them to be married; this she seems to view as something of a real accomplishment, especially as she is the youngest of them.

Jane Austen, the author of the novel, also wrote that Lydia has "high animal spirits, and a sort of natural self-consequence" which has been strengthened into an over-self-assurance, due to her mother's years of spoiling her.

Of the three youngest of the five Bennet sisters, Lydia is seen the most.  And, it is said in volume 3, chapter 19 (the epilogue) that, now married, Lydia was not in the end living the 'high life' she had thought it would be, but didn't really seem to notice this fact ("It had always been evident to [Elizabeth] that such an income as theirs, under the direction of two persons so extravagant in their wants, and heedless of the future, must be insufficient to their support; and whenever they changed their quarters, either Jane or [Elizabeth], were sure to be applied to, for some little assistance towards discharging their bills.  Their manner of living, even when the restoration of the peace dismissed them to a home, was unsettled in the extreme.  They were always moving from place to place in quest of a cheap situation, and always spending more than they ought.  [George Wickham]'s affection for [Lydia] soon sunk into indifference; [Lydia's] lasted a bit longer; and in spite of her youth and her manners, [Lydia] retained all the claims to reputation which her marriage had given her").

Additional

Notes

References

Bibliography

Further reading
 
 
 
 
 
 
 
 

Bennet, Mr
Literary characters introduced in 1813
Fictional gentry
Fictional families